Nagyréde is a village in Heves County, Hungary.

The town is located about 8 kilometers west of Gyöngyös, next to Main road 3.

References

Populated places in Heves County